Kim Tillie (born 15 July 1988) is a French professional basketball player for Cholet Basket of the French LNB Pro A. He played college basketball at the University of Utah. He is a 2.11 m (6'11") tall power forward, who can also play as a small ball center.

Early years
Tillie graduated from Lycee Jean de la Fontaine High School, in Paris, France, where he played high school basketball. As a youth, he also played basketball with the junior teams of the club Paris Basket Racing.

College career
Tillie played 4 seasons of college basketball at the University of Utah, with the Utah Utes, from  2006 to 2010. He wasn't drafted in the 2010 NBA draft.

Professional career
After his college basketball career, Tillie returned to France, in May 2010, and signed a two-year deal with ASVEL. In July 2011, he extended his contract with ASVEL. He played with the Washington Wizards' summer league squad in the 2012 NBA Summer League.

In July 2012, he left France, and signed a two-year deal with UCAM Murcia of the Spanish Liga ACB. In July 2014, he signed a one-year deal with the Spanish EuroLeague club Baskonia. In July 2017, he signed a two-year deal with the Greek EuroLeague club Olympiacos. However, he was waived on 5 July 2018.

On 25 July 2018 Tillie signed a one-year deal with Herbalife Gran Canaria of the Liga ACB and the EuroLeague. On 8 July 2019 Tillie signed a one-year deal with AS Monaco of the LNB Pro A.

On 6 February 2020 he signed with Budućnost of the Adriatic League.  Tillie signed with Ryukyu Golden Kings on 6 July 2020. 

On August 2, 2021, Tillie returned to Greece, signing with Kolossos Rodou. In 22 games, he averaged 8.5 points, 5.6 rebounds, 0.8 assists and 0.8 steals, playing around 24 minutes per contest.

On July 25, 2022, he returned to France, signing with Cholet Basket.

National team career
Tillie was a member of the junior national teams of France. With France's junior national teams, he played at the 2006 Albert Schweitzer Tournament, where he won a gold medal, the 2006 FIBA Europe Under-18 Championship, where he won a gold medal, the 2007 FIBA Under-19 World Cup, where he won a bronze medal, and the 2008 FIBA Europe Under-20 Championship.

Tillie has also been a member of the senior French national basketball team. With France's senior national team, he has played at the 2014 FIBA Basketball World Cup, where he won a bronze medal, and at the 2016 Summer Olympics.

Career statistics

EuroLeague

|-
| style="text-align:left;"| 2014–15
| style="text-align:left;"| Baskonia
| 24 || 1 || 18.1 || .452 || .385 || .773 || 4.6 || 1.0 || .8 || .1 || 5.5 || 6.8
|-
| style="text-align:left;"| 2015–16
| style="text-align:left;"| Baskonia
| 29 || 21 || 22.4 || .456 || .267 || .717 || 3.8 || .9 || 1.0 || .2 || 6.0 || 6.3
|-
| style="text-align:left;"| 2016–17
| style="text-align:left;"| Baskonia
| 32 || 15 || 19.1 || .549 || .407 || .912 || 3.8 || 1.1 || .7 || .2 || 6.9 || 8.2
|-
| style="text-align:left;"| 2017–18
| style="text-align:left;"| Olympiacos
| 10 || 3 || 16.1 || .481 || .571 || .571 || 2.4 || .5 || .2 || .2 || 3.8 || 3.1
|- class="sortbottom"
| style="text-align:left;"| Career
| style="text-align:left;"|
| 95 || 40 || 19.6 || .489 || .387 || .780 || 3.9 || .7 || .2 || .2 || 5.9 || 6.7

Personal life
Tillie's father, Laurent Tillie, is a former professional volleyball player and coach of the French national volleyball team. He is also the brother of Kevin Tillie, a professional volleyball player, and Killian Tillie, currently playing in the NBA with the Memphis Grizzlies.

References

External links
Kim Tillie at acb.com 
Kim Tillie at esake.gr 
Kim Tillie at eurobasket.com
Kim Tillie at euroleague.net
Kim Tillie at fiba.com (archive)
Kim Tillie College Stats at espn.com

1988 births
Living people
2014 FIBA Basketball World Cup players
AS Monaco Basket players
ASVEL Basket players
Basketball players at the 2016 Summer Olympics
CB Gran Canaria players
CB Murcia players
Centers (basketball)
Cholet Basket players
French expatriate basketball people in Greece
French expatriate basketball people in Spain
French expatriate basketball people in the United States
French men's basketball players
Kolossos Rodou B.C. players
Liga ACB players
Olympiacos B.C. players
Olympic basketball players of France
People from Cagnes-sur-Mer
Power forwards (basketball)
Saski Baskonia players
Sportspeople from Alpes-Maritimes
Utah Utes men's basketball players